Architaenioglossa is a taxonomic group of snails which have gills and often an operculum. They are primarily land and freshwater gastropod mollusks within the clade Caenogastropoda.

This "informal group" has been shown to be polyphyletic in a study by Harasewych et al., published in 1998.

Taxonomy
Superfamily Ampullarioidea
Family Ampullariidae
 † Family Naricopsinidae
Superfamily Cyclophoroidea
Family Cyclophoridae
Family Aciculidae
Family Craspedopomatidae
Family Diplommatinidae
 † Family Ferussinidae
Family Maizaniidae
Family Megalomastomatidae
Family Neocyclotidae
Family Pupinidae
Superfamily Viviparoidea
Family Viviparidae
 † Family Pliopholygidae

(Families that are exclusively fossil are indicated with a dagger †)

References